Jindřich Skupa (born 25 July 1962) is a Czech sports shooter. He competed in the men's 25 metre rapid fire pistol event at the 1992 Summer Olympics.

References

1962 births
Living people
Czech male sport shooters
Olympic shooters of Czechoslovakia
Shooters at the 1992 Summer Olympics
Sportspeople from Brno